This article presents lists of the literary events and publications in 1518.

Events
unknown dates
Baptista Mantuanus' Eclogues are prescribed for use in St Paul's School, London.
Niccolò Machiavelli probably writes his satirical comedy The Mandrake (La Mandragola).

New books

Prose
Henry Cornelius Agrippa – De originali peccato
Erasmus – Colloquies
Frederyke of Jennen
Tantrakhyan (Nepal Bhasa literature)

Poetry

Thomas More – Epigrammata
probable
Alexander Barclay – The fyfte Eglog
Cock Laurel's Boat

Births
February 7 – Johann Funck, German theologian (died 1566)
August – Conrad Lycosthenes, né Wolffhart, Alsatian humanist and encyclopedist (died 1561)
unknown date – Edmund Plowden, English legal writer (died 1585)

Deaths
February 25 – Publio Fausto Andrelini, Italian humanist poet (born c.1462)
unknown date – Kabir, Indian mystic poet and saint (born 1398 or 1440 at the latest)

References

1518

1518 books
Years of the 16th century in literature